Varxan (also, Varkhan) is a village and municipality in the Saatly Rayon of Azerbaijan.  It has a population of 2,023.

References 

Populated places in Saatly District